Svetlana Aleksandrovna Lipatova (born 2 February 1993 in Kazan) is a Russian wrestler who participated at the 2010 Summer Youth Olympics in Singapore. She won the bronze medal in the girls' freestyle 60 kg event, defeating Ahmed Dzhanan of Bulgaria in the bronze medal match. She is runner-up 2015 European Games in 60 kg.

In 2020, she won the gold medal in the women's 59 kg event at the Individual Wrestling World Cup held in Belgrade, Serbia. In 2021, she was eliminated in her first match in the women's 59 kg event at the 2021 World Wrestling Championships held in Oslo, Norway.

In 2022, she competed at the Yasar Dogu Tournament held in Istanbul, Turkey.

References

External links 
 

Wrestlers at the 2010 Summer Youth Olympics
Russian female sport wrestlers
Living people
European Games silver medalists for Russia
European Games medalists in wrestling
Wrestlers at the 2015 European Games
1993 births
European Wrestling Championships medalists
21st-century Russian women